Karlo Lovric

Players 
As of 20 January 2014.

Summer

In:

Out:

Winter

In:

Out:

Nemzeti Bajnokság I

League table

Matches

Hungarian Cup

Friendly games (2015)

Friendly games (2016)

References

Szombathelyi Haladás seasons
Hungarian football clubs 2015–16 season